Anita O'Day & the Three Sounds is an album by vocalist Anita O'Day and The Three Sounds recorded for the Verve label in late 1962.

Reception 

The Allmusic review by Bruce Eder stated: "This strange (and strangely compelling) album is the most controversial of all O'Day's Verve Records releases, popular among O'Day's hardcore fans for the showcase that the Three Sounds' near-minimalist accompaniment affords her singing ... while O'Day sings five songs. She is amazingly restrained and low-key throughout most of her work here ... she seems uninspired in terms of any inventiveness, with long stretches of silence where one would have expected her to improvise.

Track listing 
 "When the World Was Young" (Philippe-Gérard, Johnny Mercer) – 3:30
 "Someday My Prince Will Come" (Frank Churchill, Larry Morey) – 4:21
 "All Too Soon" (Duke Ellington, Carl Sigman) – 3:15
 "My Heart Stood Still" (Richard Rodgers, Lorenz Hart) – 3:33
 "My Ship" (Kurt Weill, Ira Gershwin) – 4:30
 "Leave It to Me" (Donn Trenner) – 5:12
 "Whisper Not" (Benny Golson, Leonard Feather) – 2:52
 "Blues by Five" (The Three Sounds) – 4:36
 "(Fly Me to the Moon) In Other Words" (Bart Howard) – 3:44
 "You and the Night and the Music" (Arthur Schwartz, Howard Dietz) – 2:35

Personnel 
Anita O'Day − vocals (tracks 1, 3, 5, 7, 9 & 10)
Gene Harris – piano
Andrew Simpkins – bass
Bill Dowdy – drums
Roy Eldridge − trumpet (track 7)

References 

Anita O'Day albums
The Three Sounds albums
1963 albums
Verve Records albums
Albums produced by Creed Taylor
Albums recorded at Van Gelder Studio